Ruslan Hlivinskiy (born 7 February 1975) is a Ukrainian athlete. He competed in the men's high jump at the 2000 Summer Olympics.

References

1975 births
Living people
Athletes (track and field) at the 2000 Summer Olympics
Ukrainian male high jumpers
Olympic athletes of Ukraine
Place of birth missing (living people)